William Irvine (April 19, 1885 – October 26, 1962) was a Canadian politician, journalist, and clergyman. He served in the House of Commons of Canada on three occasions, as a representative of Labour, the United Farmers of Alberta, and the Co-operative Commonwealth Federation. During the 1920s, he was active in the Ginger Group of radical Members of Parliament (MPs).

Early life
Irvine was born at Gletness in Shetland, Scotland, one of twelve children in a working-class family.  He became a Christian socialist in his youth, and worked as a Methodist lay preacher.  He moved to Canada in 1907 after being recruited for ministerial work by James Woodsworth, the father of future CCF leader J. S. Woodsworth.

Irvine was a follower of the social gospel, and rejected biblical literalism.  He refused to sign the Articles of Faith when ordained as a Methodist minister, claiming that he accepted the ethical but not the supernatural aspects of Christian belief.  He was nonetheless accepted into the ministry, and was stationed at Emo, Ontario, in 1914.  Irvine was accused of heresy the following year by a church elder, and, although acquitted of the charge, chose to resign his commission.  He left the Methodists, and accepted a call to lead the Unitarian Church in Calgary, Alberta in early 1916.

In addition to his work as a Unitarian minister, Irvine became politically active after moving to Alberta.  He helped establish an Alberta branch of the radical agrarian Non-Partisan League (NPL) in December 1916, and was an NPL representative at the creation of the Alberta Labor Representation League (LRL) in April 1917.  Irvine himself stood as an LRL candidate in the 1917 provincial election, but was defeated in Calgary.  He also founded the Nutcracker newspaper in 1916, and oversaw its later transformations to the Alberta Non-Partisan and the Western Independent.

Political career

First campaigns
He campaigned for the House of Commons of Canada in 1917, as a Labour candidate opposing Robert Borden's Unionist government during the Conscription Crisis election of 1917. His platform overlapped with that of the Alberta Non-Partisan League. While not a pacifist, Irvine denounced war profiteering and called for the "conscription of wealth" rather than of men.  He was accused of holding pro-German sympathies. He was defeated, and he also lost his funding from the American Unitarian Association in Boston.

Still supported by his local congregation, he set up his own "People's Church" in Calgary in 1919 as part of the Labour church movement.

In the same year, he helped establish the Alberta wing of the Dominion Labor Party.

Irvine lived briefly in New Brunswick in 1920, and supported that province's United Farmers movement during a federal by-election. After returning to Calgary, he helped convince the United Farmers of Alberta (UFA) to enter political life.  The UFA was divided between those who supported direct political action, and others such as UFA leader Henry Wise Wood who wanted it to remain an agrarian pressure group.  Direct politics was endorsed following a series of public debates between Irvine and Wood at UFA meetings. Wood was successful in restricting the UFA's membership to farmers.

Irvine's first book, Farmers in Politics (1920), endorsed the UFA policies of economic co-operation and group government.

Member of Parliament, 1920s
Irvine was first elected to the House of Commons in the 1921 federal election as a Dominion Labour Party candidate in Calgary East.  Two other Labour MPs were elected in Canada that year - Joseph Shaw (Calgary) and J. S. Woodsworth (Winnipeg North Centre). Irvine became close political and personal friends with Woodsworth.

Irvine and Woodsworth launched an investigation into social credit, and invited social credit theorist Major C.H. Douglas, Edmonton farmer/bank reformer George Bevington and others to speak to the House of Commons investigating committee on monetary and bank reform. Although Irvine was never a member of the Social Credit Party, he was interested in social credit monetary theories, believing that monetary reform was an important part of bringing a co-operative commonwealth into effect. Their investigation of bank reform had special potency as it came just as the Home Bank of Canada collapsed, leaving many families penniless and it led to the first discussion of social credit in Canada. Information on their investigation is available in the Irvine/DLP book Purchasing power and the world problem: Social control of credit (1924).

Irvine was defeated in 1925 when he ran for re-election.

He was next elected in 1926, when he ran for the UFA in the rural Alberta riding of Wetaskiwin. Despite the change in his party affiliation, he remained a leading ally of Woodsworth and of farmer-labour co-operation. He, Woodsworth and many Farmer and Labour MPs formed the "Ginger Group", which pushed and prodded the House of Commons to pass pro-labour and pro-farmer legislation.   His book Co-operative Government was published in 1929.

In the late 1920s, Irvine introduced a bill to abolish capital punishment.

The meeting in which Irvine, Woodsworth and several other farmer and labour MPs decided to found a national labour-farmer political party, the Co-operative Commonwealth Federation party, was held in Irvine's parliamentary office in 1932. 

Irvine was active in the founding of the CCF in Calgary in 1932 and helped bring the UFA into the CCF in early 1933 and the parliamentary UFA caucus into the CCF for the 1935 election.

Irvine became the first president of the Alberta CCF.

He and all the other UFA MPs were defeated in the 1935 election, succumbing to Social Credit candidates.

Irvine wrote many books on the CCF's policies and plans. This included Let us reason together: An appeal to Social Crediters and C.C.F.'ers (1936); The Forces of Reconstruction. A Review of World-Conditions under Capitalism, and the forces working towards the Co-operative Commonwealth (1934); Co-operation or Catastrophe. An Interpretation of the Co-operative Commonwealth Federation and its Policy
(1934); and Is socialism the answer?: The intelligent man's guide to basic democracy (1945). He also wrote two plays on political and economic reform You Can't Do that and In Brains We Trust.

He attempted to re-enter parliament in 1936 through a by-election in Assiniboia, Saskatchewan but was defeated by former Saskatchewan Premier James Garfield Gardiner.

He returned to parliament in the 1945 election for the British Columbia riding of Cariboo.  He served in the House of Commons for four years. He was defeated in 1949 when the opposition united behind Liberal candidate George Matheson Murray.

Irvine made three more attempts to return to parliament, in the 1950s, but was unsuccessful each time.

Notes

References

Footnotes

Bibliography

Further reading

External links
William (Bill) Irvine and The Social Gospel
 
 Irvine fonds at Glenbow, Calgary 

1885 births
1962 deaths
Canadian clergy
Canadian Unitarians
Co-operative Commonwealth Federation MPs
Ginger Group MPs
Labour MPs in Canada
Members of the House of Commons of Canada from Alberta
Members of the House of Commons of Canada from British Columbia
Progressive Party of Canada MPs
Scottish emigrants to Canada
Canadian Christian socialists
Alberta Labor Representation League politicians
Candidates in Alberta provincial elections
United Farmers of Alberta MPs
Canadian Methodist ministers
Unitarian socialists
20th-century Canadian politicians